Heydar Kar (also Romanized as Ḩeydar Kar) is a village in Azna Rural District, in the Central District of Khorramabad County, Lorestan Province, Iran. At the 2006 census, its population was 18, in 4 families.

References 

Towns and villages in Khorramabad County